

The San Diego California Temple is the 47th constructed and 45th operating temple of the Church of Jesus Christ of Latter-day Saints. Located near the La Jolla community of San Diego, it was built with two main spires, but unique to this temple are four smaller spires at the base of each main spire. The East spire is topped with the familiar Angel Moroni statue which adorns most LDS temples.

History
The San Diego Temple was announced on April 7, 1984, and dedicated on April 25, 1993 by Gordon B. Hinckley.

Although there is no visitors' center, the church maintains the Mormon Battalion Historic Site in Old Town, San Diego.

In 2020, like all the church's other temples, the San Diego California Temple was temporarily closed in response to the coronavirus pandemic.

Presidents
Notable temple presidents include J. Clifford Wallace (1998-1999); Joe J. Christensen (1999–2002); and David E. Sorensen (2005–08).

Gallery

See also

 Comparison of temples of The Church of Jesus Christ of Latter-day Saints
 List of temples of The Church of Jesus Christ of Latter-day Saints
 List of temples of The Church of Jesus Christ of Latter-day Saints by geographic region
 Temple architecture (Latter-day Saints)
 The Church of Jesus Christ of Latter-day Saints in California

References

External links

San Diego California Temple Official site
San Diego California Temple at ChurchofJesusChristTemples.org
  A website with several photos of the interior of the temple.
 Website dedicated to the San Diego Temple

20th-century Latter Day Saint temples
Religious buildings and structures in San Diego
Religious buildings and structures in San Diego County, California
Religious buildings and structures completed in 1993
Temples (LDS Church) in California
1993 establishments in California